Yours Truly is the 15th studio album by British/Australian soft rock duo Air Supply released in 2001. The songs "Yours Truly" and "You Are the Reason" have gained critical acclaim.

Track listing 
All songs written by Graham Russell, except where noted.
"Who Am I" – 3:38 
"Body Glove" – 4:34 
"Don't Throw Our Love Away" – 4:58 
"Why Don't You Come Over" – 5:10 
"Tell Me of Spring" (T. Pulnam, Tim Putnam, Russell) – 4:07 
"Yours Truly" – 4:37 
"You Are the Reason" (featuring Mehnaz) – 4:28 
"Only One Forever" – 3:22 
"If You Love Me" (Clifford Rehrig, Russell, Noble Williams) – 4:22 
"The Scene" (Rehrig, Russell, Williams) – 4:30 
"Learning to Make Love to You" –  4:29 
"Peaches and Cream" (Putman, Russell) – 4:16 
"Hard to Forget Her" – 3:41

Personnel 

Air Supply
 Russell Hitchcock – lead and backing vocals
 Graham Russell – lead and backing vocals, acoustic guitar, electric guitar, keyboards (1, 2), synthesizers (4, 13)

Additional musicians
 Brian Hess – organ (3, 13)
 Jed Moss – acoustic piano (10), backing vocals (10)
 Guy Allison – acoustic piano (11)
 Jimmy Haun – guitar (2, 7)
 Larry Antonino – bass (1-4, 6, 8, 9, 13)
 Alec Milstein – bass (5, 11, 12)
 Clifford Rehrig – bass (7)
 Mark T. Williams – drums, percussion, conductor (3, 4, 6, 7, 9, 10, 13), strings (4, 9, 10, 13), arrangements (4, 9, 10, 13), orchestrations (4, 9, 10, 13), sequencing (9, 10), bass (10)
 Louis Clark – strings (3, 6, 7), arrangements (3, 6, 7)
 Mehnaz Hoosein – lead and backing vocals (7)
 Michael Sherwood – backing vocals (12)

Production 
 Graham Russell – producer, executive producer, mixing 
 Mark T. Williams – producer, mixing 
 Jay Anderson – engineer (1-6, 8–13), audio recording 
 Tom Fletcher – engineer (7)
 Eddy Schreyer – mastering at Oasis Mastering (Burbank, California).
 Katherine Delaney – design 
 Jodi Russell – cover layout, design, photography

References

2001 albums
Air Supply albums
Giant Records (Warner) albums
Albums produced by Graham Russell